The Talbot County Courthouse, on Courthouse Sq. in Talbotton, Georgia, is a brick County courthouse that was built in 1892.  It was listed on the National Register of Historic Places in 1980.

It was designed by architects Bruce & Morgan in Queen Anne style and "is smaller and more picturesque
than many of their courthouses."

It has a tall, pyramidally topped clock tower on the east corner, and a squat bell-capped tower on the west corner, linked by a gable.  It has a Romanesque arched entryway.

References

Courthouses in Georgia (U.S. state)
National Register of Historic Places in Talbot County, Georgia
Queen Anne architecture in Georgia (U.S. state)
Government buildings completed in 1892
1892 establishments in Georgia (U.S. state)